Hang Cool Teddy Bear is the tenth studio album by Meat Loaf. It was released on 19 April 2010 by Mercury Records in the UK and by Loud & Proud Records in the US on 11 May 2010, with global distribution handled by Universal Music Group.

The album was produced by Rob Cavallo and contains songs written by Justin Hawkins, Rick Brantley and Jon Bon Jovi, amongst others. Guests on the album include Brian May, Steve Vai, Paul Crook, Patti Russo, Hugh Laurie, Jack Black, and Pearl Aday. This is the fourth studio album by Meat Loaf not to include any songs written by former collaborator Jim Steinman.

The first single from the album, "Los Angeloser", was released for download on April 5, 2010.

The album was released on CD, Hardback book CD/DVD Deluxe edition, Limited Edition LP, digital and Super Deluxe Box Set. The Super Deluxe edition comes in a booklike box containing two audio CDs, a concert DVD of Meat Loaf live in 2008, a Meat Loaf metal keyring, sheet music for the track "Los Angeloser," and a Meat Loaf Hang Cool Teddy Bear album art print card. The Universal Music UK store has an exclusive version available featuring a signed certificate.

Production
In May 2009, Meat Loaf began work on the album in the studio with Green Day's American Idiot album producer Rob Cavallo, whom he credits with rescuing the project after the initial recordings were made. "I went into the studio with 19 songs and three of them made the record," Meat Loaf said. "Rob said, 'Look, these other songs are for a different album than the one we're making.'" A friend, Hollywood screenwriter Kilian Kerwin, gave Meat Loaf the idea of making a concept album. Meat Loaf and Kerwin discussed the idea of a soldier lying near death on a battlefield, but instead of his life flashing before his eyes, his possible future flashes before them. Each song presents "a different scenario in his future". Meat Loaf recruited eight songwriters for the album— including Jon Foreman, Desmond Child, former American Idol judge Kara DioGuardi, The Darkness frontman Justin Hawkins, Rick Brantley, Eric Sean Nally, Tommy Henriksen and Jon Bon Jovi. "I didn't tell [the songwriters] what the story was and I'm kind of glad I didn't because it becomes too literal when you do that," Meat Loaf said.

Much of the work on the album was done in July 2009. It was officially completed as of December 12, 2009.

Guest musicians on the album include guitarists Steve Vai and Brian May of Queen, a longtime friend of Meat Loaf, Brooklyn musician Adam Ahuja, as well as actors Hugh Laurie and Jack Black, also old friends.

Track listing
Thirteen songs appear on the album, with a fourteenth, "Prize Fight Lover," included as a free MP3 download from hangcoolteddybear.com.

A fifteenth song was recorded as a B-side to "Los Angeloser" entitled "Boneyard." It features Meat Loaf's daughter, Pearl Aday. A further B-side is available for purchase on iTunes (US store only) entitled "Don't Get Me Going" on the "If I Can't Have You" EP. That EP also includes a single edit of "If I Can't Have You" and a live version of "Hot Patootie (Bless My Soul)" recorded on the 2010 tour.

Disc 1

Disc 2: Tour Edition
During Meat Loaf's 2010 UK tour, a special two-disc tour edition was given out. The second disc included four songs recorded live at the PNC Bank Arts Center in Holmdel, New Jersey, on July 16, 2010.

Reception

Writing for The Guardian, Caroline Sullivan said: "Hang Cool, Teddy Bear is of a piece with the rest of his catalogue: the pounding guitars never slacken, emotions are writ very large and the lyrics rarely lack sly wit...less happily, the tempo never varies – this album desperately needs a ballad – and 13 unrelenting tracks is a good deal more than enough." The Times gave a positive review, saying: 'Everything about Meat's eleventh album screams novelty cabaret “metal”, yet this is his most credible record in three decades. Ditching the theatrical cheese, Meat, 62, can still bellow an anthem of youthful lust.' The Independent was more skeptical, pointing to correlation between recruiting guest-performers and the weakness of 'a high-profile performer's output'.

Chart performance
The album charted at #4 in the official UK album chart on April 25, 2010. It peaked at #27 on the US Billboard 200.

The Hang Cool Tour
The Hang Cool Tour commenced on July 3, 2010, in support of the album and consisted of three legs through Europe and North America until August 5, 2011.

Personnel
 Produced by Rob Cavallo
 Mixed by Chris Lord-Alge
 Engineered by Doug McKean
 Mastered by Ted Jensen
 String and percussion arrangements on "Peace on Earth": David Campbell

The album art is by Boris Vallejo.

Musicians
 Meat Loaf – lead vocals

The Neverland Express
 Paul Crook – guitar
 Randy Flowers – guitar, backing vocals (tracks 1–4, 7, 8, 10–13)
 Kasim Sulton – bass guitar, backing vocals
 John Miceli – drums
 Patti Russo – female lead vocals (track 11), featured vocals (track 2), backing vocals (tracks 1–3, 7, 8, 10, 12, 13)
 Carolyn "C.C." Coletti-Jablonski – backing vocals (tracks 2, 7, 8, 10, 12, 13)

Regular Meat Loaf studio sidemen
 James Michael – guitar, backing vocals (track 3)
 Tim Pierce – guitar
 Pearl Aday – backing vocals ("Boneyard")

Session musicians
 Adam Ahuja – "3rd verse R&B guitar" (track 5)
 Rob Cavallo – additional guitar (track 5)
 Chris Chaney – bass guitar
 Jamie Muhoberac – keyboards
 Eric Dover, Jaime Neely, Julian Raymond, Eric Skodus – backing vocals (track 9)
 Carmen Carter – backing vocals (tracks 2, 11)
 Marcus Blake, Georgia Haege (also track 2), Jim Wilson – backing vocals (tracks 7, 8, 10, 12, 13)

Guest appearances
 Rick Brantley – guitar, backing vocals (tracks 1, 2, 7)
 Justin Hawkins – guitar, backing vocals (tracks 3, 5, 9)
 Steve Vai – additional guitar (tracks 5, 7)
 Brian May – additional guitar (track 5)
 Hugh Laurie – piano (track 4)
 Kara DioGuardi – female lead and backing vocals (track 4)
 78violet – backing vocals (track 4)
 Jack Black – backing vocals (track 6)
 Jake Scherer – backing vocals (track 6)

Charts

References

External links
 

Albums produced by Rob Cavallo
Meat Loaf albums
2010 albums